San Silvestro may refer to:

San Silvestro in Capite, church in Rome
San Silvestro al Quirinale, church in Rome
San Silvestro, Venice, church in Venice
Chiesa di San Silvestro, in Viterbo

See also
Saint Sylvester (disambiguation)